Victor Borisovich Lidskii (4 May 1924, Odessa – 29 July 2008, Moscow) was a Soviet and Russian  mathematician who worked in spectral theory, operator theory, and shell theory. Lidskii discovered the  Lidskii theorem in 1959. His adviser at Moscow State University was Israel Gelfand.

References

External links

Soviet mathematicians
Mathematical analysts
20th-century Russian mathematicians
21st-century Russian mathematicians
1924 births
2008 deaths
Mathematicians from Moscow
Scientists from Odesa
Moscow State University alumni